is a shōjo romance manga based on school life. Written by Mitsuba Takanashi, it consists of 11 volumes.

Plot summary
High school is difficult for most kids. But for Kayano, a shy girl whose single mother seems to work all the time, it's even worse than usual. She's so afraid of drawing attention to herself that she can't tell the handsome Kamijo how much she loves him. One day she finally gets up the courage to write him a love letter confessing her feelings.

But her plans go awry when the letter falls into the hands of the school's most notorious student, Edogawa Takeru. To Kayano, Takeru seems to be Satan himself. Not only is he devilishly handsome, he is also the son of the school's principal.

To make things worse, her mother comes home to announce she's marrying ... principal Edogawa! Now Kayano will have to live with Takeru 24/7!

In an unexpected twist, Kayano and Takeru gradually begin to grow feelings for each other the more they interact. Many obstacles get in their way, and the biggest one is to face their parents and come clean about their true feelings for each other. How will their parents react? What will happen to the soon-to-be family?

Characters
 Kayano Saitou Kayano is a shy second-year student in high school who lives with her widowed mother. Kayano has a kind heart and can be stubborn sometimes, despite her shy appearance. She grows stronger as the story progresses. Her most important characteristic is her endless compassion for others. She hates hurting others and tries to bring happiness into people's lives, even if it makes her unhappy. At last, she get what she always wanted: love.

 Takeru Edogawa He is a first-year student, the bad boy of the school, and the principal's son. He is first seen as a good-looking delinquent who like to cause trouble, but as the story progresses, we see a softer side of Takeru. He is very mature for his age and is protective of people he cares about, often blaming himself if anything bad happens to them. He is a year younger than Kayano. He is not nice even to the people he cares about most. He says things really mean in order to cover up his feelings. He was inspired by former X JAPAN member Hideto Matsumoto who died in 1998.
   
 Rika Moroboshi One of Takeru's childhood friend who is in love with him.
 
 Youhei Takeru's childhood friend who harbors a crush on Rika. He is very fond of Kayano. Youhei stays with Takeru despite Takeru's attitude because Takeru stood up for him in the past when they were kids
 
 Kamijou Yuucihi Captain of the basketball team, Kayano has liked him since the beginning until she met Takeru. Kamijou develops a short crush on Kayano. When he finds out she likes him, they decide to remain friends. He develops feelings for Harukawa and dates her later in the manga
   
 Harukawa Kyoko One of Kayano's best friends who encourages her to do many things. She is outgoing, strong-willed, and confident. She later becomes Kamijou's girlfriend.

 Nanachan One of Kayano's best friends.

 Yuzuru Takeru's little brother who went to live with their mother in Europe when they were young. He is introduced as a junior high student toward the middle of the story.

 Shin Fujita Kayano's childhood crush. He shows up in the story as a teacher. He is a good and gentle guy, who always cheered up Kayako when she was young.

Manga
The series was published in Shueisha monthly shōjo Bessatsu Margaret magazine and the serial chapters were collected into 11 tankōbon. The series was re-released in a seven-bunkoban edition in 2008.

Outside Japan, the series is licensed by Panini Comics in France, by Tong Li Publishing in Taiwan, and CMX Manga in North America. The series was formerly licensed by Star Comics in Italy.

Reception
Carla Cino in the French Animeland described the series as a perfect read between two trains as its neither gives headache nor is transcending. Its problem is that there are numerous manga with similar plots. The "fashion" aspect of the characters and Takeru's piggish side giving a semblance of novelty.

Live-action drama

The manga was adapted into a 20 episode Taiwanese drama (titled ) starring Mike He, Rainie Yang and Kingone Wang. It was directed by Lin He Long (林合隆) and was broadcast on free-to-air China Television (CTV) (中視) from 26 June to 18 September 2005 and cable TV Eastern Television (ETTV) (東森) for 20 episodes.

References

External links

2002 comics endings
CMX (comics) titles
Manga adapted into television series
Romantic comedy anime and manga
Shōjo manga
Shueisha franchises
Shueisha manga